Konstantino-Alexandrovka is a rural locality (a village) in Pervomaysky Selsoviet, Sterlitamaksky District, Bashkortostan, Russia. The population was 21 as of 2010. There is 1 street.

Geography 
Konstantino-Alexandrovka is located 54 km northwest of Sterlitamak (the district's administrative centre) by road. Novoabdrakhmanovo is the nearest rural locality.

References 

Rural localities in Sterlitamaksky District